Earl of Norwich was a title that was created four times in British history, three times in the Peerage of England and once in the Peerage of Great Britain. The first creation came in the Peerage of England in 1626 in favour of the courtier and politician Edward Denny, 1st Baron Denny. He had already been created Baron Denny, of Waltham in the County of Essex, in 1604, also in the Peerage of England. Lord Norwich was the grandson of Sir Anthony Denny, confidant of Henry VIII, and the nephew of Sir Edward Denny. He had no sons and the titles became extinct on his death in 1630.

The second creation came in the Peerage of England in 1644 in favour of George Goring, 1st Baron Goring, a prominent Royalist commander in the English Civil War. He was the son of George Goring, of Hurstpierpoint and Ovingdean, Sussex, by Anne Denny, sister of the first Earl of the 1626 creation. He had already been created Baron Goring in 1628, also in the Peerage of England. His elder son George Goring, Lord Goring, gained distinction as a Royalist soldier during the Civil War, but predeceased his father. Lord Norwich was therefore succeeded by his younger son, Charles, the second Earl. He was childless and the titles became extinct on his death in 1671.

The third creation came in the Peerage of England in 1672 in favour of Henry Howard, 1st Baron Howard of Castle Rising, second son of Henry Howard, 22nd Earl of Arundel and younger brother of Thomas Howard, 5th Duke of Norfolk. He had already been created Baron Howard of Castle Rising in 1669, also in the Peerage of England. He exercised the duties of Earl Marshal in place of his disabled elder brother. In 1677 he succeeded his unmarried brother in the dukedom. He was himself succeeded by his eldest son, the seventh Duke and second Earl. The latter was succeeded by his nephew, the eighth Duke and third Earl. He was the son of Lord Thomas Howard. The eighth Duke was childless and was succeeded by his younger brother, the ninth Duke and fourth Earl. On his death in 1777, childless, the barony of Howard of Castle Rising and earldom of Norwich became extinct. He was succeeded in the dukedom by his second cousin once removed, Charles Howard, 10th Duke of Norfolk. See Duke of Norfolk for further history of the dukedom.

The fourth creation came in the Peerage of Great Britain in 1784 in favour of Alexander Gordon, 4th Duke of Gordon. He had already been created Baron Gordon of Huntly, in the County of Gloucester, in 1784, also in the Peerage of Great Britain. Gordon was the great-grandson of George Gordon, 1st Duke of Gordon, and his wife Lady Elizabeth Howard, daughter of the sixth Duke of Norfolk and first Earl of Norwich of the 1672 creation. He was succeeded by his son, the fifth Duke. He had no legitimate male issue and the dukedom (and other titles created at the same time as this peerage), earldom of Norwich and barony of Gordon of Huntly became extinct on his death in 1836. He was succeeded in the marquessate of Huntly and remaining Scottish titles by his kinsman George Gordon, 5th Earl of Aboyne. See Marquess of Huntly for further history of these titles.

While the 12th-century chronicler Orderic Vitalis and others occasionally refer to Ralph de Gaël as "Earl of Norwich" (comes Nortguici), his official title was "Earl of East Anglia", his line being officially counted as the first creation of the Earls of Norfolk.

Earls of Norwich; First creation (1626)
Edward Denny, 1st Earl of Norwich (d. 1637)

Earls of Norwich; Second creation (1644)
George Goring, 1st Earl of Norwich (1585–1663)
George Goring, Lord Goring (1608–1657)
Charles Goring, 2nd Earl of Norwich (1615–1671)

Earls of Norwich; Third creation (1672)
Henry Howard, 1st Earl of Norwich (1628–1684) (succeeded as Duke of Norfolk in 1677)
Henry Howard, 7th Duke of Norfolk, 2nd Earl of Norwich (1655–1701)
Thomas Howard, 8th Duke of Norfolk, 3rd Earl of Norwich (1683–1732)
Edward Howard, 9th Duke of Norfolk, 4th Earl of Norwich (1685–1777)

Earls of Norwich; Fourth creation (1784)
 Alexander Gordon, 4th Duke of Gordon, 1st Earl of Norwich (1743–1827)
 George Gordon, 5th Duke of Gordon, 2nd Earl of Norwich (1770–1836)

See also
Viscount Norwich

References

Extinct earldoms in the Peerage of England

Extinct earldoms in the Peerage of Great Britain
Noble titles created in 1626
Noble titles created in 1644
Noble titles created in 1672
Noble titles created in 1784
1836 disestablishments in the United Kingdom
Earls of Norwich